Nedra Glover Tawwab is an American mental health therapist, social worker,  and writer. She is the author of the book Set Boundaries, Find Peace: A Guide to Reclaiming Yourself, which was a New York Times bestseller.

Life and career 
Tawwab was born and raised in Detroit, Michigan. She received her undergraduate degree in 2005 and her master's of social work degree in 2007 from Wayne State University. She is licensed as an LCSW. Tawwab began her therapy practice in Detroit and relocated to Charlotte, North Carolina in 2009, where she opened Kaleidoscope Counseling.

She gained prominence for her mental health-related Instagram posts. She created her account in 2017 and grew her followers to around 2,000 over the next two years. She saw a tremendous boost in her followers after she was featured in a New York Times article. Her social media posts often contain "insight on mental health topics that range from forgiveness to realistic goals, packaged in bite-sized chunks." As of January 2023 she had 1.6 million followers.

She specializes her work on the topic of healthy relationships and boundaries, "something that keeps you safe and comfortable in your relationships". Tawwab released her first book Set Boundaries, Find Peace: A Guide to Reclaiming Yourself in March 2021 under Penguin Random House. The book was on the New York Times Best Seller list for four weeks. She later published an accompanying workbook.

She resides in Charlotte, North Carolina with her husband and children.

References

External links 
 Official website

Year of birth missing (living people)
Living people
21st-century African-American women
African-American women writers
Writers from Detroit
American psychotherapists
American health and wellness writers
Wayne State University alumni